The Compagnie Béninoise de Négoce et de Distribution, known as CBND, is a retail and trading company based in Benin.

Operations
CBND can be described as two companies, Innovation SA and STND, both of which are active in the distribution of famous brand name goods in Africa.  Printed textiles are an important part of the group's activity and CBND has marketed textiles in Benin in affiliation with the CFAO Groupe.

A representative list of the group's sectors and brand names:
Textiles : Wax Hollandais, Wax UK, Fancy Prints
Tobacco products : Fine, Gauloises, Viking, Gitanes
Health :Colgate-Palmolive.
Miscellaneous : Société Bic, Campingaz 
Alcoholic beverages : VitaMalt, Johnnie Walker, Martini & Rossi, Moët & Chandon, Champagne Mercier, etc.
Foods : Knorr, De Rica, Laits Candia & Golden Royal, Café JAG
Retail markets : la Maison du Vin, Cash Supermarché.

Related organizations
CBND is affiliated with the following manufacturers:
Société Française de Commerce Extérieur (SFCE Groupe CFAO) 
Colgate Palmolive France, Côte d'Ivoire et Sénégal. 
Groupe Altadis (European Tobacco Company) 
NETTER 
VLISCO 
TEXICODI 
MBR

CBND's banking partners:
Ecobank
Financial Group
Continental Bank - Benin
Bank of Africa - Benin

External links
 Compagnie Béninoise de Négoce et de Distribution

Companies of Benin